Wang Yi; ca. (1333-unknown) was a Chinese painter of human figures during the Yuan Dynasty (1271–1368). His specific date of death is unknown.

Wang was born in Muzhou (睦州 present day Jiande 建德) in Zhejiang province and lived in Hangzhou. His style name was 'Sishan' (思善) and his pseudonym was 'Chi Juesheng' (痴绝生). Wang's developed his own distinct style of painting human figures that demonstrated good shape and spirit. He edited "The Secrets of Painting Human Figures" (写像密诀) to describe his experiences of human figure painting.

Notes

References
 Ci hai bian ji wei yuan hui (辞海编辑委员会）. Ci hai （辞海）. Shanghai: Shanghai ci shu chu ban she （上海辞书出版社）, 1979.

1330 births
Year of death unknown
Yuan dynasty painters
Artists from Hangzhou
Painters from Zhejiang